James Broselow (born January 12, 1943) is an American emergency physician, an assistant professor, an inventor and an entrepreneur. He and fellow emergency physician Robert Luten, M.D., are best known in the medical community for inventing the Broselow Tape in 1985, which was the first tool developed relating a pediatric patient's height to their weight in order to “determine the size of equipment, supplies, and dosages of medication to use…” during emergencies. The Broselow Tape is featured in many medical textbooks and reference manuals as the standard for length based weight measures.

Currently, Broselow serves as the chief medical officer of eBroselow, LLC, a company he co-founded in 2009 that has developed the Artemis solution, an electronic and digital drug dosing and tracking system and medical device for emergency medical services and emergency rooms. The company's mission is to save lives by simplifying acute care while reducing medical errors. He is also a clinical associate professor of emergency medicine in the Department of Emergency Medicine at the University of Florida College of Medicine – Jacksonville, where he explores, develops and communicates about new approaches to pediatric emergency medicine.

Early years

Broselow was born in Woodbury, New Jersey (NJ), United States, to Benjamin and Charlotte Broselow. He grew up in Franklinville, NJ. He obtained his undergraduate degree in economics from Dartmouth College in 1965 and his medical degree from the New Jersey College of Medicine and Dentistry in 1969.

Medical career

After graduating from medical school, Broselow became board certified as a family physician and entered private practice in Frankenmuth, Michigan, United States. Through his work in private practice he became interested in emergency medicine and in 1980, moved to North Carolina where he practiced emergency medicine in three community hospitals: Lincoln County Hospital, Cleveland Memorial, and Catawba Valley Medical Center. He retired from clinical practice in 2006.

Inventions and entrepreneurial work

Broselow Holds 12 patents related to safe emergency treatment of children. He started several businesses including Broselow Medical Technologies, LLC in the 1990s and presently is founding partner of eBroselow, LLC.
 US4713888 - Measuring tape for directly determining physical treatment and physiological values (also EP0220860A2, EP0220860A3 and EP0220860B1)
 US4823469 - Measuring tape for directly determining physical treatment and physiological values and procedures
 US5010656 - Therapeutic apparatus
 US6132416 - Universal medication dosing system (also EP0983761A3 and EP0983761A2)
 US 2006/0000480 A1 - Method of infusing a therapeutic fluid into a patient
 US 2006/0137696 A1 - Zone-based pediatric and veterinary dosing system
 US 2007/0061164 A1 - Healthcare information storage system
 US 2008/0257895 A1 - Plate with holder for a beverage container
 US 2010/0057488 A1 - Method for determining medical treatment values without data entry
 EP0343874 A1 - Therapeutic apparatus
 EP0343874 B1 - Therapeutic apparatus
 EP1539274A4 - Color-coded medical dosing container (also US20040024368 and US6764469)

Awards and recognition

In 2012, Broselow received the Lifetime Achievement Award from the Institute for Safe Medication Practices.

Personal

Broselow lives in Hickory, North Carolina with his wife Millie.

References

External links
 eBroselow.com

1943 births
20th-century American inventors
21st-century American inventors
American emergency physicians
American businesspeople
Living people
University of Florida faculty
People from Woodbury, New Jersey
People from Franklin Township, Gloucester County, New Jersey
People from Hickory, North Carolina
People from Frankenmuth, Michigan